is a Japanese novel by Kō Hiratori, first published in Japan as a web novel from October 2016 to August 2017 on the website Shōsetsuka ni Narō. It was later acquired by Hayakawa Publishing, who published it in December 2017 with cover art by shimano. The novel follows the high school student Haru Koyama, who is transported to another world after her death, where she begins work as a sex worker.

A second volume titled JK Haru is a Sex Worker in Another World: Summer, which is a collection of several short stories that complement the main story, was published in December 2019. The novel has also been adapted into a manga series, illustrated by J-ta Yamada.

Plot 
The high school student Haru Koyama and her classmate Seiji Chiba are killed in a traffic accident and are teleported to another world together. While Chiba becomes an adventurer and goes out to slay monsters, Haru discovers that women are not allowed to have special powers in the new world, so she decides to make a living as a sex worker.

Media 
JK Haru is a Sex Worker in Another World is written by Kō Hiratori. It started as a web novel on the website Shōsetsuka ni Narō in October 2016. In December 2017, it was acquired by Hayakawa Publishing, who published it in print with cover art by shimano. In North America, the publisher J-Novel Club licensed the series and published it as an e-book in English.

A manga adaptation, illustrated by J-ta Yamada, started on June 14, 2019. It is serialized on the Manga Ōkoku website under its Utsutsu label. It has been published by Shinchosha in four volumes in the tankōbon format as of July 2021. Seven Seas Entertainment licensed the manga in North America and will publish it under its Ghost Ship imprint. The manga adaptation will end with the release of its seventh volume.

Reception 
JK Haru is a Sex Worker in Another World won an award in the doujinshi, or private publication category at the BookWalker Grand Prix Awards 2019 from digital publisher BookWalker. The work was also BookWalker's sixth best-selling e-book of 2019. In the 2019 edition of the annually published light novel guide Kono Light Novel ga Sugoi!, JK Haru is a Sex Worker in Another World was listed at number seven in the tankobon category.

Kim Morrissy wrote in her column "The Best (and worst) Isekai Light Novels" on Anime News Network that JK Haru is a Sex Worker in Another World is embracing the isekai genre in a much darker and more deranged manner as a commentary on the genre. In it, the female protagonist Haru is thrown into a misogynist fantasy world and has to work as a prostitute to survive, while her classmate, who has also been teleported into this world, is endowed with superhuman powers. Morrissy interprets this as a mirror for how these medieval-looking worlds of this genre are particularly restrictive towards women, while male characters are not confronted with such situations due to their privileges.

References

External links 
 JK Haru is a Sex Worker in Another World on Shōsetsuka ni Narō (18+, Japanese)
 
 JK Haru is a Sex Worker in Another World manga on MyAnimeList
 JK Haru is a Sex Worker in Another World on J-Novel Club

2019 Japanese novels
Anime and manga based on novels
Fiction about reincarnation
Isekai anime and manga
Isekai novels and light novels
J-Novel Club books
Japanese webcomics
Josei manga
Novels about prostitution
Novels first published online
Prostitution in comics
Seven Seas Entertainment titles
Shinchosha manga
Shōsetsuka ni Narō
Webcomics in print